Carpenter's Station, Louisiana, is an unincorporated historical community centered around a 19th century railroad stop in Richland Parish, Louisiana.

The 1875 Cram's Rail Road & Township Map of Louisiana and the 1879 Rand, McNally & Co.'s Business Atlas Map of Louisiana show the location as "Carpenter's" and "Carpenters" (respectively) between Bee Bayou and Delhi, Louisiana, east of modern-day Rayville in northeastern Richland Parish.  The 1897 Rand, McNally & Co.'s New Business Atlas Map of Louisiana places "Carpenters" between Callaway and Delhi.

The railroad serving the community in 1879 was the Louisiana & Texas R. R. and in 1897 the Shreveport & Pacific R. R.

References

Unincorporated communities in Richland Parish, Louisiana
Unincorporated communities in Louisiana